The so-called Victory Internationals is a list of rugby union matches played in Europe from 1945 to 1946 between British, New Zealand and French rugby union representatives.

During the Second World War, international matches were suspended, with the exception of some matches between Italy, Germany and Romania. Earlier, in June 1939, France was re-admitted to play in the 1940 international match against British teams, but the so-called "Five Nations" championship could start only in 1947.

The international matches were not recognized as "official" ("capped matches") by British unions due to the absence of many players still serving in the armed forces in European and Pacific ocean theatres. France however did award full caps for each of these games.

The New Zealand selection was called the "Kiwis", and was also known as the 2nd New Zealand Expeditionary Force Rugby Team (a group of New Zealand soldiers), a name derived from 2NZEF. Like its British counterparts, it did not award any notional cap, but this team eventually became widely recognized in its country and more than half of the Kiwi players ended up also playing for the All Blacks.

The activity restarted on 1 January 1945, with a match between France and a British Army selection, played in Colombes, followed by a match played at Richmond on 28 April, between a "British Empire XV" and France. More regular matches were played between December 1945 and April 1946.

In 2013, the Welsh Rugby Union finally decided to award a cap for all the otherwise uncapped Welsh players who took part in the 1945 and 1946 matches against France.

Results

References

Victory
Victory
tour
tour
tour
tour
tour
Five Nations
Five Nations